Séguéla is a town in western Ivory Coast. It is the seat of both the Woroba District and the Worodougou Region. It is also a commune and the seat of and a sub-prefecture of Séguéla Department.

Séguéla is served by Séguéla Airport.
In 2021, the population of the sub-prefecture of Séguéla was 103,905.

Villages
The forty two villages of the sub-prefecture of Séguéla and their population in 2014 are:

References

Sub-prefectures of Worodougou
District capitals of Ivory Coast
Communes of Worodougou
Regional capitals of Ivory Coast